Samuel Armes (30 March 1908 — 1958) was an English footballer who played at outside right.

Armes joined Wigan Athletic in 1934, and went on to score 20 goals in 47 Cheshire League games before being signed by Leeds United during the 1935–36 season.

References

1908 births
1958 deaths
Sportspeople from Seaham
Footballers from County Durham
English footballers
Association football outside forwards
Dawdon Colliery Welfare F.C. players
Carlisle United F.C. players
Chester City F.C. players
Blackpool F.C. players
Wigan Athletic F.C. players
Leeds United F.C. players
Middlesbrough F.C. players
English Football League players
Association football midfielders